The Leclerc XLR is a third-generation French main battle tank (MBT) developed and manufactured by the Nexter division of KMW+Nexter Defense Systems (KNDS). It is a refit of the third-generation Leclerc tank with the addition of a turret-mounted remotely-operated 7.62mm caliber machine gun manufactured by Belgian company FN Herstal, additional modular armor on the turret and hull, and rear wire cage armor to protect the engine compartment against rocket propelled grenades.

The components that mark this tank as fourth-generation are mostly electronic: networked architecture allowing an interface between the Thales tactical radio system, the NBC protection system, night vision equipment and the Atos-brand SCORPION Information and Command System (SICS) and associated display screens. The upgraded Leclerc comes with a counter-IED jammer, new man-machine interfaces for commander and gunner, redesigned main system computers, and a battle health monitoring system. The inertial navigation system and GPS navigation system are fused.

History
The fourth-generation upgrade of 200 Leclercs was announced in March 2015, with the first two XLR prototypes planned for 2018 and the remaining 198 slated for completion over eight years, starting in 2020. The contract was valued at approximately €330 million.

On 1 January 2022, the Indian Army was rumored to have invited the French to bid for a contract to supply 1,000 units of the Leclerc XLR to replace the aging Indian T-72 fleet. An Indian analyst noted that an advantage of the Russian T-14 Armata tank over the XLR is its Afganit-brand Active Protection System, which the XLR does not have. With each Leclerc XLR said to cost $6.5 million in January 2022, the analyst concluded that the $3.7 million Armata was more likely to be selected for the Indian Future Ready Combat Vehicle contract, which had attracted a total of 12 bidders.

References

Main battle tanks of France
Nexter Systems
Post–Cold War main battle tanks
Tanks with autoloaders
Military vehicles introduced in the 2020s
Post–Cold War military equipment of France
Fourth-generation main battle tanks
Trial and research tanks